The Minister for Public Works was a position in the Luxembourgian cabinet.  It was replaced by the position of Minister for Sustainable Development and Infrastructure on 23 June 2009, having previously existed since the first cabinet of Luxembourg, back in 1848, with the exception of some intermittent spells in the nineteenth century.

From 24 March 1936, the title of Minister for Public Works was an official one, although the position had been unofficially known by that name since its creation.  From the position's creation until 28 November 1857, the Minister went by the title of Administrator-General.  From 1857 until 1936, the Minister went by the title of Director-General.

List of Ministers for Public Works

Footnotes

References
 

 
Public Works, Minister for